Ambohibary Vohilena is a rural commune in Analamanga Region, in the Central Highlands of Madagascar. It belongs to the district of Anjozorobe and its populations numbers to 27,651 in 2018.

Economy
The economy is based on agriculture.  Rice, corn, peanuts, beans, manioc, soja and oignons are the main crops.

References

External links

Populated places in Analamanga